Show of Evil is a 1995 novel by William Diehl, the sequel to Primal Fear.

Plot
Ten years after saving Aaron Stampler from the death penalty, Martin Vail — now a district attorney — is plagued by his client-turned-nemesis once again when a series of murder victims turn up with mysterious ties to the erstwhile serial killer.

References

1995 American novels
Legal thriller novels
American thriller novels
Sequel novels
English-language novels